"California Dreamin'" is a song by The Mamas & the Papas.

California Dreamin' or similar may also refer to:
The California Dream of sudden wealth and fame

Film
[[California Dreamin' (film)|California Dreamin''' (film)]], a 2007 Romanian film
California Dreaming (1979 film), a 1979 film starring Glynnis O'Connor, Dennis Christopher and Tanya Roberts
Television
California Dreamin' (All the Cleves are Brown), an episode of The Cleveland Show.
California Dreaming (TV series), a British reality television programmeCalifornia Dreams'', American TV situation comedy

Music
''California Dreamin''' (Bud Shank album), a 1966 jazz album by Bud Shank
California Dreaming (Wes Montgomery album), a 1966 jazz album by guitarist Wes Montgomery
California Dreaming (Rick Price and Jack Jones album), a 2017 album by Australian musicians Rick Price and Jack Jones
"California Dreaming", a song by Hollywood Undead

Other
California Dreaming (novel), a 2008 novel by Zoey Dean